LaGrange College is a private college in LaGrange, Georgia. Founded in 1831 as a female educational institution, LaGrange is the oldest private college in Georgia. It is affiliated with the United Methodist Church and offers more than 55 academic and pre-professional programs, including graduate degrees in education.

History

On December 26, 1831, the charter for LaGrange Female Academy was granted by the Georgia Legislature. Most of the Creek Indians had been removed from the LaGrange area six years before, and relocated to Indian Territory west of the Mississippi River. At the time, the only other college in the state was Franklin College, now the University of Georgia.

The college began as a women's academy (high-school level), housed in a large white building down the street from where the current campus was developed. A few years later, in 1851, the institution moved to its present location on "the Hill," the highest geographical point in the city of LaGrange.

In 1847, the school was renamed as LaGrange Female Institute, and the charter was amended to allow the school the power to confer degrees. The name was changed to LaGrange Female College in 1851, with the adoption of a four-year curriculum.

The Georgia Conference of the Methodist Episcopal Church South took ownership of the college in 1856. Today, it is an institution of the North Georgia Conference of the United Methodist Church.

As discussions continued about admitting men, LaGrange Female College became LaGrange College in 1934. In 1953, the institution's Board of Trustees officially made it coeducational.

The size of the campus doubled in 1992 thanks to the donation of land and facilities from Callaway Foundation, Inc., that included Callaway Auditorium, Callaway Education Building, six tennis courts, two softball fields, sites for Cleaveland Baseball Field and the soccer field, and a swimming pool that was converted into Charles D. Hudson Natatorium in 1995.

Academics

The college offers more than 55 academic and pre-professional programs. Students may earn a Bachelor of Arts, Bachelor of Science, Bachelor of Music, and the Bachelor of Science in Nursing. A Master of Arts degree in Teaching, Master of Education degree in Curriculum and Instruction, and Specialist in Education degree in Curriculum and Instruction also are offered.

LaGrange operates on the modified (4-1-4) semester system for day classes, which provides for fall and spring semesters, separated by a January Interim Term. There is an evening session during the regular year and in the summer.  In addition, LaGrange College began offering online courses in the Spring 2013 term.

Servant Scholars Program
Begun in fall 2012, the Servant Scholars Program is exclusively for juniors and seniors who have demonstrated high academic achievement, engagement and leadership on campus. Living and serving locally, these students partner in building a stronger and healthier community.

The program is housed in the newly renovated Broad Street Apartments, a local landmark built in 1936 and located halfway between the campus and downtown LaGrange. Among the only apartments in the city at the time, they filled a vital housing gap and provided a first home for many families.

After falling into disrepair, the apartments were purchased by Callaway Foundation, Inc., in December 2009. The foundation funded their renovation, and the work was completed by Batson-Cook Co. of West Point. The property was turned over to the college in spring 2012.

Evening classes
Students enrolled in Business Administration or Human Development programs normally attend classes on Monday through Thursday evenings. Students may enroll in September, January or March. Students in the above programs also may earn a minor in Sociology, Psychology or Human Resource Management.

Transfer students with 60 hours of acceptable credit are eligible to apply for enrollment in the Degree Completion Programs in Public Health or Health and Human Services. Classes in the 23-month cohort programs are scheduled one night per week.

Evening College offers four degrees:
 Bachelor of Arts in Business Administration
 Bachelor of Arts in Health and Human Services
 Bachelor of Arts in Human Development
 Bachelor of Arts in Public Health

Accreditation
LaGrange College is accredited by the Commission on Colleges of the Southern Association of Colleges and Schools to award the degrees of Bachelor of Arts, Bachelor of Music, Bachelor of Science, Bachelor of Business Administration, Bachelor of Science in Nursing, Master of Education, Master of Arts in Teaching, the Specialist in Education degree in Curriculum and Instruction, and the Master of Arts in Organizational Leadership.

LaGrange College is also approved by the United Methodist University Senate. It has membership in the National Association of Independent Colleges and Universities and the Georgia Foundation for Independent Colleges.

LaGrange College's teacher education (undergraduate and graduate) programs are accredited by the Georgia Professional Standards Commission to recommend candidates for certification in the areas of early childhood, middle grades or secondary education.

The Bachelor of Science in Nursing program is accredited by the National League for Nursing Accrediting Commission.

The undergraduate programs in business administration, business management, and accounting are accredited by the Accreditation Council for Business Schools and Programs (ACBSP).

Campus
The LaGrange campus blends historic and contemporary buildings on roughly 120 acres in the heart of LaGrange, Georgia.

Smith Hall

Smith Hall, also known as College Home, is the oldest building on the campus. The main portion of the building was constructed in 1860 of handmade brick formed from local clay. Smith Hall served as a hospital for wounded soldiers during the Civil War. An addition was built in 1887. Smith Hall was named in memory of Mrs. Oreon Mann Smith, wife of former college president Rufus Wright Smith, who served from 1885 until his death in 1915. The building was added to the National Register of Historic Places on August 26, 1982.

A major renovation was completed in 1989 at a cost of more than $2.5 million. The building now houses offices, classrooms and seminar rooms. It is located at coordinates  / 33.039444°N 85.0425°W / 33.039444; -85.0425.

Other campus structures
Broad Street Apartments
Originally constructed in 1936 and fully renovated in 2012, the Broad Street Apartments, located two blocks east of the main campus and presented to the college as a gift from the Callaway Foundation, Inc., now house the Servant Scholars Program.

Callaway Auditorium
Built in 1941, Callaway Auditorium was originally designed as a multipurpose venue. It served in that capacity for more than half a century. Though versatile, the facility was severely limited in its ability to provide an accommodation that was greatly needed by the community and LaGrange College: an acoustically pleasing music performance venue. The demand for such a facility was satisfied in 2005 with the auditorium's transformation into a state-of-the-art concert hall.

Callaway Education Building
Built in 1965, renovated in 1994 and given a $2 million, 17,000-square-foot addition in 2006, the building houses the music program, offices of intercollegiate and intramural athletics, offices of health and physical education, a weight room, an athletic training room and a football locker room.

Cason J. Callaway Science Building
Built in 1972, this three-story brick building provides for instruction in biology, chemistry, math and physics.

Fuller E. Callaway Academic Building
Completed in 1981 and renovated in 2000, the Fuller E. Callaway Academic Building houses the History, Political Science and Psychological Science programs and the Department of Nursing.

The Chapel
The materials used in the construction of the Chapel in 1965 link it with Christian worship in LaGrange and other parts of the world. Included in the structure are two stained glass windows made in Belgium more than 100 years ago; a stone from the temple of Apollo at Corinth, Greece; a stone from the Benedictine Monastery in Iona, Scotland; and a stone from St. George's Chapel in Windsor, England.
	
Lamar Dodd Art Center
Completed in 1982 and fully renovated and modernized in 2011, this building provides a physical environment and the equipment needed for art instruction as well as gallery space for the college's art collection. The building is named in honor of the late Lamar Dodd, a Georgia artist who grew up in LaGrange and whose paintings won international recognition.

Frank and Laura Lewis Library
January 2009 saw the opening of the 45,000-square-foot Frank and Laura Lewis Library at LaGrange College. Named for two former librarians, the facility includes numerous small-and-large-group study rooms; a 24-hour study room with a coffee bar/snack bar area; an auditorium; a multi-media classroom; a multi-media production center; student and faculty research carrels; and state-of-the-art audio-visual equipment.

The print and electronic collections in the library support the curriculum and general information needs of students and faculty. Included are more than 200,000 printed and electronic books, an excellent reference collection, a large DVD and CD collection and numerous full-text databases for all academic disciplines. Notable digital collections include JSTOR, Project Muse, the Archive of Americana, the Burney 17th and 18th Century British Newspapers, the London Times Digital Archives, PsycArticles, MathSciNet, ATLAS Religion Database, CINAHL, ReferenceUSA, Access World News, plus many more in addition to the various databases available through GALILEO.

Price Theater
Completed in 1975, this building features a 280-seat proscenium theater with 36 fly lines, eight electrics (including four beam positions over the auditorium) and a hydraulic orchestra pit. It also houses the Theatre Arts program, including faculty offices, a scenery workshop, dressing rooms, a costume shop, an actors' lounge and a Black Box Theatre.

Sunny Gables Alumni House
Built by Mary and Julia Nix in 1925, Sunny Gables Alumni House is an outstanding example of early 20th century Tudor Revival architecture. Designed by P. Thornton Marye, it is now part of the National Register of Historic Places' Vernon Road Historic District. This multipurpose facility serves as the permanent home for alumni. The facility extends entertainment space to the college's constituents for specific programming purposes.

Turner Hall
Built in 1958 (not long after the institution became co-educational), this three-story brick building was first used to provide campus housing for men, and later, women. In 2003, the structure was renovated and enlarged. The Mabry Gipson Student Center features large and small meeting rooms, a student grill and the Jones Zone on the first two floors. Student housing on the third floor is known as the William H. Turner Jr. Residence Hall.

Student life
LaGrange offers more than 50 student groups as part of its living/learning experience. Many students also participate in service efforts, Greek life and spiritual life activities.

Fraternities: 
Pi Kappa Phi
Delta Tau Delta
Alpha Delta Gamma

Sororities:
Alpha Omicron Pi
Kappa Delta
Phi Mu

Intramural sports
Overseen by Athletics, intramurals provide opportunities for recreation and competition among members of the campus community. Teams representing campus organizations and independents compete in organized tournaments and events throughout the year. Competitive events include flag football, volleyball, basketball, softball, dodge ball and Ultimate Frisbee. Special awards are presented to the men and women's groups with the highest participation rates and best records of the entire year. In addition, male and female "Athletes of the Year" are selected.

Many opportunities are available for recreational use of the facilities in the LaGrange College Aquatics Complex: recreational swimming and lap swimming all year round in the indoor pool, as well as water aerobics or aqua exercise classes (non-credit). Students also enjoy use of fully equipped weight-training room and a fitness area.

Spiritual life
Growing out of its history of service and its connection to the United Methodist Church, the college offers a number of opportunities for students, faculty and staff members to celebrate life and explore God's intention for human living through intellectual, social and spiritual growth. The college employs two ministers to help students, faculty and staff to deepen their understanding of their faith as they engage in free intellectual inquiry.

Athletics

LaGrange College is a member of NCAA Division III and the Collegiate Conference of the South (CCS), formed in July 2022 by an amicable split of the previously 19-member USA South Athletic Conference. The college's nickname is Panthers and its colors are red and black. Intercollegiate teams compete in women's soccer, basketball, cross country, volleyball, softball, swimming, lacrosse and tennis; and men's baseball, football, lacrosse, basketball, cross country, golf, soccer, swimming and tennis. The CCS does not sponsor football or women's lacrosse; under the terms of the conference split, all CCS members that sponsor those sports, including LaGrange, are USA South associate members in those sports.

Under NCAA guidelines, no athletic scholarships are offered at Division III schools.

The Panthers football program was launched in 2006, and women's lacrosse was added in 2010. The school also has a host of intramural activities. LaGrange athletic facilities include a $2 million baseball stadium, a natatorium and a softball complex.

In 2008, the Panthers football team rewrote NCAA Division III history when it went from its first two seasons of 20 straight losses to a 9-1 conference championship and a trip to the national playoffs, a turnaround record that stands to this day.

In 2014 & 2016 the Men's Lagrange College Basketball team won the Conference Championship.

The LaGrange College Softball team won the Conference Championship from 2007 to 2009.

The 2003 Baseball and Men's Golf teams won the USCAA National Championships. The 2003 baseball team set a then school record for most wins in a season (36) and fewest losses (10).

Alumni
Famous alumni include Dean W. Young (1960), nationally syndicated cartoonist of the "Blondie" comic strip; Dwayne Shattuck (1983), Emmy Award-winning producer of "Mad Men" and "Magic City;" Elizabeth Carlock Harris (1961), former First Lady of Georgia;  Terry Kay (1959), best-selling author ("To Dance with the White Dog"); Lee Crowe (1981), special effects animator for Warner Brothers; R. Lee Walburn (1959), writer and editor of "Atlanta Magazine;"  and Blake Clarke (1969), television and film actor ("Home Improvement," "The Waterboy" and "Boy Meets World").

References

External links
Official website
LaGrange College Athletics
New Georgia Encyclopedia

 
1831 establishments in Georgia (U.S. state)
Buildings and structures in Troup County, Georgia
Education in Troup County, Georgia
Educational institutions established in 1831
Former women's universities and colleges in the United States
Universities and colleges accredited by the Southern Association of Colleges and Schools
Private universities and colleges in Georgia (U.S. state)